The Wildcat Hills are an escarpment between the North Platte River and Pumpkin Creek in the western Panhandle, in the state of Nebraska in the Great Plains region of the United States.

Chimney Rock, Scotts Bluff, and Courthouse and Jail Rocks are outcrops along the northern and western edges of the Wildcat Hills.

Ecology 

The plant and animal life in the Wildcat Hills is atypical for Nebraska; the ecology resembles that of the Laramie Mountains, 60 miles to the west. The dominant tree in the region is the ponderosa pine.  Bighorn sheep, pronghorn, elk, mule deer, and wild turkeys live in and around the hills.

Cougars (mountain lion), which had been eradicated from the region around 1900, returned to the area in the early 1990s. The Wildcat Hills (along with the Pine Ridge), are the only areas in Nebraska with a permanent population.

History 

The Emigrant Trail passed through the northern Wildcat Hills at Robidoux Pass and after 1851, at Mitchell Pass; the rock formations were frequently mentioned in emigrant journals and letters. The Nebraska Game and Parks Commission acquired land for the Wildcat Hills State Recreation Area  in stages between 1929 and 1980; the Wildcat Hills Nature Center, featuring a half-mile boardwalk trail, opened in 1995. Today, the Wildcat Hills are a popular hiking and wildlife viewing destination.

References

External links 
Wildcat Hills State Recreation Area

Regions of Nebraska
State parks of Nebraska
Protected areas of Banner County, Nebraska
Protected areas of Scotts Bluff County, Nebraska
Escarpments of the United States
Nature centers in Nebraska
Landforms of Banner County, Nebraska
Landforms of Scotts Bluff County, Nebraska
Hills of Nebraska
Landforms of Morrill County, Nebraska